The Hyundai Super Truck Medium (hangul:현대 슈퍼 중형트럭) is a line of medium-duty commercial vehicle by Hyundai Motor Company. The range was primarily available as cargo and dump truck. Its model truck name is 'Hyundai', but in USA and Canada market the brand name is 'Bering', manufacture from 1999 or 2001. 

Most medium-duty truck models are distinguishable by a front 'Hyundai Truck' badge, but the common Hyundai and badge is usually used on the rear.

In North America, Japan, Asia-Pacific, Mid-East, Africa, South America, its principal competitors are Bering MS, Kia Rhino.

Models
Hyundai Super Truck Medium is a name used by Hyundai Motor Company in commercial vehicle of trucks for more related models. a cargo truck & dump truck, Designed by Hyundai Motor Company and Bering Truck. Manufacture period in 1997–2004. Rebadged by Bering MS.
4.5 ton Cargo (short/long/ultra-long)
5 ton Cargo (short/long/ultra-long)
4.5 ton Dump (short body)
5 ton Dump (short body)

Super Truck Medium
Rear-wheel-drive vehicles